Following is a list of dams and reservoirs in Montana.

All major dams are linked below.

Dams and reservoirs in Montana 

This list is incomplete.  You can help Wikipedia by expanding it.

Black Eagle Dam, unnamed reservoir, NorthWestern Energy
Box Elder Creek Dam, Boxelder Lake, City of Plentywood
Bynum Reservoir Dam, Bynum Reservoir, Teton Cooperative Reservoir Company
Canyon Ferry Dam, Canyon Ferry Lake, United States Bureau of Reclamation 
Clark Canyon Dam, Clark Canyon Reservoir, USBR
Cochrane Dam, unnamed reservoir, NorthWestern Energy
Como Dam, Como Lake, USBR
Cooney Dam, Cooney Reservoir, State of Montana
Fort Peck Dam, Fort Peck Lake, United States Army Corps of Engineers
Fresno Dam, Fresno Reservoir, USBR
Gibson Dam, Gibson Reservoir, USBR
Hauser Dam, Hauser Lake, NorthWestern Energy
Hebgen Dam, Hebgen Lake, NorthWestern Energy
Holter Dam, Holter Lake, NorthWestern Energy 
Hungry Horse Dam, Hungry Horse Reservoir, USBR
Kerr Dam, Flathead Lake, Energy Keepers Inc. 
Kicking Horse Dam, Kicking Horse Reservoir, Bureau of Indian Affairs
Libby Dam, Lake Koocanusa, USACE
Lower Two Medicine Dam, Lower Two Medicine Lake, Lake Elwell, Bureau of Indian Affairs
Madison Dam, Ennis Lake, NorthWestern Energy
Milltown Dam (removed)
Morony Dam, unnamed reservoir, NorthWestern Energy
Mystic Lake Dam, Mystic Lake, NorthWestern Energy
Noxon Rapids Dam, Noxon Reservoir, Avista
Rainbow Dam, unnamed reservoir, NorthWestern Energy
Ryan Dam, unnamed reservoir, NorthWestern Energy
Lake Sherburne Dam, Lake Sherburne, USBR
Swift Dam, Swift Reservoir, Pondera County Canal and Reservoir Company
Thompson Falls Dam, unnamed reservoir, NorthWestern Energy
Tiber Dam, Lake Elwell, USBR
Tongue River Dam, Tongue River Reservoir, Montana Department of Natural Resources and Conservation
Toston Dam, Toston Reservoir, Montana Department of Natural Resources
Willow Creek Dam, Willow Creek Reservoir, USBR
Yellowtail Dam, Bighorn Lake, USBR

References 

 
 
Montana
Dams
Dams